250 Water Street is a site in the Financial District of Lower Manhattan in New York City. It is currently occupied by a parking lot, located in the South Street Seaport, one of the city's historic districts. The Howard Hughes Corporation owns the site, and has released several proposals for converting the existing parking facility into a residential or mixed-use development.

Development and site history

Early history
In the 19th-century, a five-story thermometer factory occupied the site. The site also previously held other factories in which work with mercury occurred and a gas station.

Milstein Properties ownership
Milstein Properties purchased the site in 1979 for $5.8 million. Due to the site's location at the edge of the South Street Seaport Historic District, the New York City Landmarks Preservation Commission (LPC) was required to approve all proposals for the site.  Eight proposals by Milstein failed to see approval by the LPC. Milstein's first two proposals for the site were buildings designed by architect Ulrich Franzen. The first plan called for a 23-story structure, and the second a 475-foot, 43-story apartment building. Both faced opposition from locals, and both were rejected by the city.  A third proposal for an Art Deco-inspired building designed by Jan Hird Pokorny was also rejected. Milstein's failures were likely informed by Milstein's 1981 conversion of the New York Biltmore Hotel from a hotel to an office building. Preservationists were disappointed by the speed with which the conversion occurred, and that Milstein did not preserve the building's Palm Court. However, a 1991 proposal was approved, designed by Charles A. Platt and Paul Spencer Byard, but it was never built.

Howard Hughes Corporation ownership

The Howard Hughes Corporation purchased the site in 2018 from Milstein Properties for $180 million. Milstein provided a $130 million loan to Howard Hughes to finance the purchase. At the time of the sale, Howard Hughes owned several nearby sites. After the acquisition, the first plans for the site were revealed in early 2020, though Howard Hughes denied they were reflective of their real intentions for the site. The organization claimed in a statement that the designs had leaked as part of the portfolio of a former Skidmore, Owings & Merrill architect and were not reflective of real plans. The leaked plans depicted a 1,052-foot tower clad in brick. Later in 2020, official plans calling for a development with two towers rising from a single podium were released.

A third proposal, featuring four shorter, closely gathered towers rising from a single podium and forming a single structure, was made public in early April 2021. The Landmarks Preservation Commission approved this design in early May. In addition to this approval, the project must go through the city's Uniform Land Use Review Procedure for work to begin. The ULURP process began in May 2021, but the vote was not planned to occur until 2022. The Howard Hughes Corporation agreed in October 2021 to pay $40 million for air rights above the South Street Seaport Museum's Tin Building and Pier 17. Subsequently, the city government approved plans for the site at the end of 2021. The 26-story building was to rise  and contain 270 apartments (including at least 70 affordable housing units), as well as offices. Excavations on the site began in 2022, although workers found very few historical artifacts.

Opposition to development
Designs commissioned by Milstein Properties faced opposition from locals, including by Paul Goldstein, then chairman of Manhattan Community Board 1. The various Skidmore, Owings & Merrill designs have also faced opposition outside the LPC. Opponents of the development criticize it for its scale compared to the local historic district and for its introduction of housing units into a flood zone. 

A lawsuit filed during mid-2021 in an effort to prevent the development was dismissed in October of the same year, but opponents continued to pursue legal action. In a final attempt to prevent 250 Water Street from being built, the Seaport Coalition filed a lawsuit in July 2022 to prevent Howard Hughes's development from proceeding. In October 2022, New York Supreme Court judge Arthur Engoron placed an injunction on the development. According to Engoron, the LPC had rejected four proposals to develop that lot since the 1980s, but, in approving the Howard Hughes proposal, "the LPC failed adequately to acknowledge, much less explain, its departure from previous rulings." Engoron ruled against Howard Hughes in January 2023, saying that the developer and the LPC had agreed to an "impermissible quid pro quo". Howard Hughes plans to appeal Engoron's decision.

Usage
Current plans call for a 550,000 square foot building, with 270 residential units. Of these, 70 will be affordable.

References

Financial District, Manhattan
Proposed buildings and structures in New York City
Residential buildings in Manhattan
Skidmore, Owings & Merrill buildings